The Espace Léopold (French; commonly used in English) or Leopoldruimte (Dutch) is the complex of parliament buildings in Brussels, Belgium, housing the European Parliament, a legislative chamber of the European Union (EU). It consists of a number of buildings, primarily the oldest, the Paul-Henri Spaak building, which houses the debating chamber and the President's offices, and the Altiero Spinelli building, which is the largest. The buildings are located in the European Quarter of Brussels, with construction starting in 1989.

The complex is not the official seat of the European Parliament, which is the Louise Weiss building in Strasbourg, France, but as most of the other institutions of the European Union are in Brussels, the Parliament built the Brussels complex to be closer to its activities. A majority of the Parliament's work is now geared to its Brussels site, but it is legally bound to keep Strasbourg as its official home.

History

Due to the failure of leaders to agree on a single seat, the Parliament desired full infrastructure in both Brussels and Strasbourg, where the parliament's official seat is located. In Brussels an international congress centre (unofficially intended as the Parliament) was built with the backing of the Generale Maatschappij/Société Générale and BACOB who joined forces on the project in 1987. The project was built on an old brewery and marshalling yard including the covering of the Luxembourg railway station to form a pedestrian area. The building project started before 1988 with building work on the hemicycle and the north wing starting in 1989 and the south wing in 1992.

The policy committees, inter-parliamentary delegations and the political groups all meet in the complex. Consequently, the secretariat of the committees (DG IPOL and DG EXPO) and the political groups are all situated there as well. Construction on the Spinelli building started in 1991 and was completed in 1997 while the last phase of extensions (Antall and Brandt), towards Luxembourg Square along rue de Trierstraat, was completed during 2008.

Following the completion of Antall and Brandt, it is believed the complex now provides enough space for Parliament for the next ten to fifteen years with no major new building projects foreseen. Three quarters of Parliamentary activity now take place in Espace Léopold, rather than Strasbourg.

In 2008, the final extensions to the complex were completed along the Trierstraat and Luxembourg Square. Originally called the D4 and D5 buildings, there was controversy as to whom to name them after. At the death of Pope John Paul II, Polish MEPs tried to get the new buildings named after him, though this was opposed on grounds of secular government and that he did not contribute to the Parliament. Václav Havel, Nelson Mandela, Olof Palme, Margaret Thatcher and Jan Palach were all suggested by MEPs, with one satirical suggestion was naming the two buildings the "Kaczyński Towers" after the Polish brothers Lech and Jarosław Kaczyński, the first the late former president and the latter formerly Prime Minister (2006–07), who enjoy a frosty relationship with Brussels. In January 2008 the bureau reached a final decision. The new buildings were named after Willy Brandt, the German chancellor from 1969 to 1974, and József Antall, the first elected Hungarian prime minister from 1990 to 1993. The bridge connecting the new building to the original structure was named the Konrad Adenauer bridge. Konrad Adenauer was the German chancellor from 1949 to 1963. Meanwhile, the parliament's press room was named after the assassinated Russian journalist, Anna Politkovskaya.

In September 2008 Parliament held its first full plenary session (only part sessions are held in Brussels, see Location of European Union institutions) in Brussels after parts of the ceiling of the Strasbourg chamber collapsed during recess forcing the temporary move.

On 14 January 2009, the European Parliament decided to bestow the names of two distinguished and deceased MEP's to specific locations inside the building:  the reading room inside the building's library was named Salle Francisco Lucas Pires and the assembly room of the Conciliation Committee was named Salle Renzo Imbeni.

Buildings

The complex consists of the Paul-Henri Spaak building (which houses the debating chamber), the Altiero Spinelli building, two new buildings known as the Willy Brandt and József Antall buildings and a newly refurbished building which was the former entrance to the Brussels-Luxembourg Station. Between the Spinelli buildings and the Brant-Antall buildings, which are connected by the circular Konrad Adenauer footbridge, runs the esplanade of the European Parliament (or the "Mall").

Espace Léopold is a complex of buildings built from 1989 to 2004 in postmodern style. It is composed of the Paul Henri Spaak Building, containing among other things the Chamber and the President's office. In 1988, it was the subject of an architecture competition organised by the "Association des Architectes du CIC" and won by the architect Michel Boucquillon in 1988 at the age of 26. He holds the authorship and copyright recognized by the European Parliament. The CIC Architects' Association was composed of the CRV, CDG, Bontinck and Vanden Bossche offices. On the other hand, the other buildings facing the Paul-Henri Spaak building and the esplanade were designed by the Atelier Espace Léopold in the early 1990s, it also included four architectural offices: the Atelier d'Architecture de Genval http://www.genval-architecture.be/, the Cerau group, CRV and the Atelier Vanden Bossche.

Michel Boucquillon designed the building in the oval shape, a symbol of union. The facade is intended to reflect the essential notions of transparency, democracy and proximity to citizens. Parliamentarians enter the axis of the building while spectators, including the press, enter laterally. He conceives the hall of the hemicycle as a vast working space. The aim was to provide a sober, comfortable and human-scale environment that encourages exchange and dialogue. The focus is on the space of the 627 parliamentarians by visually erasing the 532 seats in the gallery. The latter is totally black in order to be absent. The atrium is the lung of the building, its role is to allow light or "truth" to flow to the level of the hemicycle. It was therefore essential to imagine a wall and a material that allowed light to flow down. The material had to be transparent to the eye. The woven stainless steel cloth fulfilled this role well. This material had never been used for architectural purposes before.

The Paul-Henri Spaak building (PHS), named after former President Paul-Henri Spaak, houses the hemicycle for plenary sessions in that city, as well as a press centre and offices for the Parliament's president and senior Parliament staff. The building just from the main buildings out into Leopold Park surrounding the far side with trees. With its striking cylinder-shaped glass dome, redolent of the Crystal Palace as well as the Northern Bordiau Hall of the nearby Parc du Cinquantenaire, the building known to locals as the "Caprice des Dieux" (whim of the gods), which is the name of a cheese with the same shape. The 12th floor President's Dining Room is the dome's interior. This is being used for some press events and special occasions. One of the glass facades inside the dome is covered with a 150 square meters large ceramic mural called Miti del Mediterraneo, portraying the abduction of Europa and other elements of Greek mythology, which was made between 1992 and 1993 by Aligi Sassu.

To the west of the Paul-Henri Spaak building is the Altiero Spinelli building, connected by a two-floor pedestrian bridge. The Altiero Spinelli building (ASP, formerly D3), named after parliamentarian Altiero Spinelli, primarily houses the offices of MEPs and political groups. It also houses shops, cafeteria and the members' bar. It is the largest building with 372,000m² of space and incorporates five high-rise towers, each up to 17 floors.

The buildings west of Spinelli are connected via the circular Konrad Adenauer footbridge (across the esplanade) to the Willy Brandt building (WIB, formerly D4), the József Antall building (JAN, formerly D5) and the old railway station building (BQL). The Brandt building began to be occupied in July 2007 by the external policies DG and the European Conservatives and Reformists group. The new complex has 375 offices in Brandt and 5 conference rooms (with 25 interpreters' booths) in Antall in addition to new press facilities. The first meeting in the Antall building took place on 7 October 2008.

The ground floor (on the rue de Trierstraat side) of the Antall building includes an entrance to the Brussels-Luxembourg station. The old building of the Brussels-Luxembourg station (originally called the Leopold Quarter Station) has been turned into a public information office and venue for ad hoc exhibitions. The first such exhibition, on the history of buildings in the EU quarter of Brussels, was held in the summer of 2007.

To the north of the Spinelli building are the Atrium and Remard buildings. The Atrium I & II buildings (ATR) hosts the DG IPOL and some political groups secretariats. Number 1 was completed in 2000, and the second in 2004. The Remard building was rented from March 2004 for a period of 9 years, with the possibility of cancellation after 6 years for an annual rent of €1,387,205.

In 2019, the European Parliament announced an open international design competition for the renovation and refurbishment of the Paul-Henri Spaak building. Of the 132 proposals submitted for consideration, 15 architects, including OMA, Snøhetta, Renzo Piano Building Workshop, Shigeru Ban Architects, and Dominique Perrault were selected to participate in the final round of the competition. In July 2022, the winning team of JDS Architects, Coldefy, Carlo Ratti Associati, NL Architects, and Ensamble Studio was announced. The estimated cost of the project is 500 million Euros.

Hemicycle

Members are arranged in a hemicycle according to their political groups who are ordered left to right according to their alignment. However the non-attached members are seated towards on the right towards the outer ring without a front bench seat. All desks are equipped with microphones, headphones for interpretation and electronic voting equipment. The leaders of the groups sit on the front benches at the centre, and in the very centre is a podium for guest speakers. The remaining half of the circular chamber is primarily composed of the raised area where the President and staff sit. Behind them there is an EU flag attached to the wall with national flags above it.

Interpreters' booths are located behind them and along the sides of the chamber, while public galleries are located at the rear. Further benches are provided between the sides of the raised area and the MEPs, these are taken up by the council on the far left and the commission on the far right. The chamber as a whole is of a wooden design, unlike the hemicycle in Strasbourg, and was extensively renovated in 2003 to create more seats and interpretation booths for the 2004 EU enlargement.

Ceiling cracks

In a turn of events reminiscent of the Strasbourg hemicycle ceiling collapse of 2008, three beams supporting the plenary chamber's ceiling were found to be cracked in August 2012. This in turn led to a complete closure for "at least six months" (as announced on 9 October 2012) of the A section of the Paul-Henri Spaak Building. In early December 2012, it became known that the damage was more serious than previously thought, and that the closure of the hemicycle was expected to last "until November 2013". All "mini plenary" meetings in Brussels until this date were scrapped, a decision that was met with "fury" by some MEPs.

Visitors

Parliament, its committees and plenary meetings are open to the public. Free audio guided tours are offered when parliament is not holding a plenary meeting. The buildings, containing several shops and banks, are largely open to the public and receive 15,000 people a day. The old station building houses the Belgian public information office on the European Parliament, and "infodoc", a specialised literary resource on the Parliament for academics and journalists. A more general public information resource is available at the "infopoint" on the esplanade side of the Spinelli building.

The ground floor of the Brandt building houses a visitors' centre on the ground floor, originally planned to open in time for the 2009 European election but it had been delayed by a year. With 6,000 square metres it will be the second largest Parliamentary visitors centre in the world, modelled on the Swedish and Danish centres, with a state-of-the-art interactive role play allowing visitors to simulate the work of an MEP in a mock hemicycle – debating and passing legislation.

The original visitor's centre was opened in the 1990s and became too small to handle visitors. The new centre includes a cafeteria, shop, children's area and a "resource area" offering databases of detailed information. There is also a permanent exhibition on the Parliament and Europe. Entry will be free and visitors will not have to gain passes or go through heavy security checks as they have to with the rest of the complex.

The European Parliament has also collected around 363 paintings and sculptures across its three sets of buildings which it has been purchasing as a pan-European cultural collection since 1979. Lidia Geringer de Oedenberg MEP, who is in charge of Parliament's art budget, plans to ensure the public have greater access by opening a 'tunnel of art' between the Espace Léopold and the Delors building. A museum of Europe will also be established in the Eastman building near Parliament in Leopold Park.

A long-standing statue outside the Paul-Henri Spaak building has become popular with tourists. The bronze statue, simply called "Europe", was created by May Claerhout and is a representation of Europa, carried by a mass of people while also being a part of it. The figure carries an "E" or the Greek "ϵ", the symbol of the euro and as a sign of European unity. The statue was given to Parliament by the Belgian presidency of the EU on 20 December 1993.

Other and former buildings
Other rented and minor buildings, outside the main complex but used by the Parliament, include a number of buildings on rue Montoyer, the Eastman building in Leopold Park (currently being expanded to host the House of European History), the "Wiertz" building, and the Wayenberg building further east of the park used as a purpose-built creche for European Parliament staff and MEPs.

The entire European Parliament in Brussels used to be housed in the Belliard building, now called the Delors building (after former President Jacques Delors). This building, and the Bertha von Suttner (ATR) buildings (after pacifist Bertha von Suttner) which is part of Espace Léopold, now house the Economic and Social Committee and the Committee of the Regions.

See also
 European parliament
 Parlamentarium
 Brussels and the European Union
 Seat of the European Parliament in Strasbourg
 European Parliament in Luxembourg
 Institutional seats of the European Union

References

External links

 Map of the Parliament buildings EuroParl website
 Naming of the buildings EuroParl website
 Seat of the EP European Navigator
 Photos of construction behind the old station "gare du luxembourg" Gregory Halliday
 Photos of the construction of D4 & D5 Gregory Halliday
 Photos of construction of "Caprice des Dieux" (Dec 1993) Gregory Halliday
 Photo of D4 near completion Eupedia
 Interview with Michel Boucquillon, designer on the building Interiordesign.net
 Building(s) For Europe, website of a 2007 exhibition of EU buildings in Brussels
 European Parliament, Cerau
 History of the Building ape-Europe.org

Buildings and structures completed in 1995
Government buildings completed in 2008
European Parliament
Buildings and structures in Brussels
Legislative buildings in Europe
Buildings and structures of the European Union
European quarter of Brussels
Tourist attractions in Brussels